"Love Street" is a song performed by the American rock band the Doors. Sequenced as the second album track on Waiting for the Sun, its lyrics were written by lead singer Jim Morrison and as with other songs, it was dedicated to his girlfriend Pamela Courson.

The song features a departure from the Doors' usual psychedelic style, including acoustic sounds and marking a conventional ballad mien. Incorporating elements from classical music, it is described by critics as having a baroque pop aesthetic. Lyrically, "Love Street" deals with lead singer Jim Morrison's personal relationship with companion, Pamela Courson.

"Love Street" was rarely played in live concerts by the group; however, one performance has been captured in a concert in Stockholm, Sweden during their 1968 European tour.

Background

The song was originally a poem written by singer Jim Morrison about the street in the Laurel Canyon section of Los Angeles, California, where he lived with his girlfriend Pamela Courson and watched hippies pass by.

The song is noted for Morrison's spoken narration, which occurs in the middle of the composition:

 
The verse end on an ambiguous note (with the line "I guess I like it fine so far"). Morrison refers to the Canyon Country Store across the street from his house. Morrison also wrote the majority of Waiting for the Sun album and much of The Soft Parade at the residence. The house was partially damaged during a spate of arson fires on December 30, 2011; the balcony was destroyed.

Critical reception
"Love Street" has been praised by many critics for its conventional style, with The Guardian ranking it as the 27th greatest Doors song. Rolling Stone critic Narendra Kusnur considered it one of Morrison's 10 most underrated songs, particularly praising his vocal performance. In an AllMusic review, critic Lindsay Planer called it a "spry and melodic ballad", while Crawdaddy music critic Paul Williams described it as "edgy, even visionary music."  Some singled out its "baroque pop feel".

Doors' drummer John Densmore described Ray Manzarek's solo during the bridge as "not flashy", but he expressed that it "gets me off every time because the phrasing is so strong, precise, and simultaneously relaxed." Planer also praised Ray Manzarek's keyboard playing as being "intricate and melodic" in the bridges but complains that Robby Krieger's "painfully understated and jazzy" guitar playing sometimes gets buried beneath the drums and keyboards.

References

External links

The Doors songs
1968 songs
Baroque pop songs
Songs written by John Densmore
Songs written by Robby Krieger
Songs written by Ray Manzarek
Songs written by Jim Morrison
Song recordings produced by Paul A. Rothchild